Tigerlily Taylor (born 10 October 1994) is a British model, the daughter of Queen drummer Roger Taylor and Debbie Leng.

Notes

British female models
1994 births
Living people